Joel Robert Waterman (born January 24, 1996) is a Canadian soccer player who plays for CF Montréal of Major League Soccer and the Canada national team.

Early life
Waterman began playing soccer at age five with Aldergrove Youth SC. At age 12, he joined Langley United. Afterwards, he played with Surrey United SC.

When he was 13, he made the British Columbia provincial team. In 2013, he represented British Columbia at the 2013 Canada Summer Games and also had a brief trial with the Vancouver Whitecaps Academy, but did not make the squad.

University career
In 2014, he began attending Trinity Western University, where he played for the men's soccer team, committing to them when he was in Grade 11. Ahead of his fifth season, he was named the team captain, and helped them win a Canada West silver medal and finished fourth at the National Championship. He was also named a Canada West First Team All Star that season.

Club career

Early career
In 2016, Waterman played in the US-based Premier Development League side Kitsap Pumas and made eleven league appearances, while also appearing in two US Open Cup matches. In 2017, Waterman played with Vancouver-based TSS FC Rovers in the PDL, where he made eleven appearances. In 2018, Waterman played for Calgary Foothills in the PDL, making fourteen league appearances and another three in the playoffs as Foothills won the PDL Championship.

Cavalry FC
At the 2018 CPL–U Sports Draft, Waterman was drafted in the second round by Cavalry FC on November 13, 2018. Initially, he had not planned on declaring for the draft, instead looking at potentially going to Europe or the United States, however, two days before the registration deadline, he decided to register. He officially signed with Cavalry on February 6, 2019. Waterman made his professional debut for Cavalry in their inaugural game against York9 FC on May 4. He scored his first goal for Cavalry on October 5 against HFX Wanderers FC. He helped Cavalry win the Spring and Fall championships and helped them reach the CPL finals, where they finished second, where he was unable to play in the second leg after being sent off in the first leg for a hand ball. In December 2019, Cavalry announced Waterman would return to the club for the 2020 season.

CF Montréal
On January 14, 2020, Waterman transferred to Major League Soccer club Montreal Impact. With this transfer, Waterman made history as the first ever player from the Canadian Premier League to be sold to an MLS club. He made his debut for the Impact on February 19 against Saprissa in a CONCACAF Champions League match. He made his MLS debut for the Impact in their season opener against the New England Revolution on February 29. Upon completion of the 2021 MLS season, CF Montréal announced that they would be exercising the option on Waterman's contract for 2022. In 2022, he became a regular starter for the club. During the 2022 season, he scored his first goal for Montreal against Orlando City on May 7, netting the opener in an eventual 4-1 victory. On August 4, he scored in the fourth minute of stoppage time to secure a 2-1 win over the Columbus Crew.

International career
He was called up to the Canadian senior national team for the first time for a national team camp in January 2021. He earned several more call-ups to the squad during 2021 and 2022. On November 11, 2022, he made his debut for Canada in a friendly against Bahrain. On November 13, Waterman was named to Canada's squad for the 2022 FIFA World Cup.

Career statistics

Club

International

Honours

Club
Calgary Foothills
Premier Development League: 2018
Cavalry FC
 Canadian Premier League Finals
Runners-up: 2019
Canadian Premier League (Regular season): 
Champions: Spring 2019, Fall 2019
CF Montreal
 Canadian Championship: 2021

Notes

References

External links

Joel Waterman Official Website

Living people
1996 births
Association football defenders
Canadian soccer players
Soccer people from British Columbia
People from Langley, British Columbia (district municipality)
Canadian expatriate soccer players
Expatriate soccer players in the United States
Canadian expatriate sportspeople in the United States
Trinity Western Spartans soccer players
Kitsap Pumas players
TSS FC Rovers players
Calgary Foothills FC players
Cavalry FC draft picks
Cavalry FC players
USL League Two players
Canadian Premier League players
CF Montréal players
Major League Soccer players
2022 FIFA World Cup players